Samantha "Sammi"  Davis (born 21 June 1964) is an English actress.

She gained considerable praise for her performances in Mona Lisa (1986), as a teenage prostitute, and Ken Russell's The Rainbow (1989). She also had significant roles in Mike Hodges' A Prayer for the Dying and John Boorman's Hope and Glory (both 1987) as well as a leading role in the American television series, Homefront (1991–1993).

From 1990 to 1993, Davis was married to director Kurt Voss. After taking a few years out of the film industry to raise her family, she returned to the screen in a cameo role on Lost, playing the mother of Dominic Monaghan's character. She moved back to Britain in Christmas 2008. On 21 June 2009, she married Simon Drew, a children's TV show producer. She now lives in Sussex with her family, and works as a photographer.

Selected filmography

Film

Television

References

External links
 
 "Down and Out with Kurt Voss", AboutFilm.com interview, March 2003.
 Film Reference biography

1964 births
Living people
English film actresses
English television actresses
People from Kidderminster
Actresses from Worcestershire